A petechia is a small red or purple spot (≤4 mm in diameter) that can appear on the skin, conjunctiva, retina, and mucous membranes which is caused by haemorrhage of capillaries. The word is derived from Italian , 'freckle,' of obscure origin. It refers to one of the three descriptive types of hematoma differentiated by size, the other two being ecchymosis (>1cm in diameter) and purpura (4-10mm in diameter). The term is always used in the plural (petechiae), since a single petechia is seldom noticed or significant.

Causes

Physical trauma
The most common cause of petechiae is through physical trauma such as a hard bout of coughing, holding breath, vomiting, or crying, which can result in facial petechiae, especially around the eyes. Such instances are harmless and usually disappear within a few days.
 Constriction, asphyxiation – petechiae, especially in the eyes, may also occur when excessive pressure is applied to tissue (e.g., when a tourniquet is applied to an extremity or with excessive coughing or vomiting).
 Sunburn, childbirth, weightlifting
 Gua Sha, a Chinese treatment that scrapes the skin
 High-G training
 Hickey
 Asphyxiation
 Choking game
 Oral sex

Non-infectious conditions
 Vitamin C deficiency, scurvy
 Vitamin K deficiency
 Leukemia
 Thrombocytopenia – Low platelet counts or diminished platelet function (e.g., as a side effect of medications or during certain infections) can give rise to petechial spots
 clotting factor deficiencies – (Von Willebrand disease)
 Hypocalcemia
 Idiopathic thrombocytopenic purpura
 Coeliac disease
 Aplastic anaemia
 Lupus
 Kwashiorkor or Marasmus – Childhood protein-energy malnutrition
 Erythroblastosis fetalis
 Henoch–Schönlein purpura
 Kawasaki disease
 Schamberg disease
 Ehlers–Danlos syndrome
 Sjögren syndrome – Petechial spots could occur due to vasculitis, an inflammation of the blood vessels. In such a case immediate treatment is needed to prevent permanent damage. Some malignancies can also cause petechiae to appear.
 Radiation
 Fat embolism syndrome

Infectious conditions
 Babesiosis
 Bolivian hemorrhagic fever
 Boutonneuse fever
 Chikungunya
 Cerebral malaria
 Congenital syphilis
 Crimean–Congo hemorrhagic fever
 Cytomegalovirus
 Dengue fever
 Dukes' disease
 Ebola
 Endocarditis
 Influenza A virus subtype H1N1
 Hantavirus
 Infectious mononucleosis
 Marburg virus
 Neisseria meningitidis
 Rocky Mountain spotted fever
 Scarlet fever
 Typhus
 Streptococcal pharyngitis   – Petechiae on the soft palate are mainly associated with streptococcal pharyngitis, and as such it is an uncommon but highly specific finding.

Forensic science 
Petechiae on the face and conjunctiva (eyes) are unrelated to asphyxiation or hypoxia.

Despite this, petechiae are used by police investigators in determining whether strangulation has been part of an attack. The documentation of the presence of petechiae on a victim can help police investigators prove the case.  Petechiae resulting from strangulation can be relatively tiny and light in color to very bright and pronounced.  Petechiae may be seen on the face, in the whites of the eyes or on the inside of the eyelids.

See also 
 Hematoma
 Purpura
 Ecchymoses

References

External links 

Symptoms and signs: Skin and subcutaneous tissue